Ignacio Jose Urrutia was a Cuban historian. He was born in 1730, died 1795. His most famous work, Teatro historico, juridico y politico-militar de la isla Fernandina de Cuba, was published in 1789.

References
Diccionario Enciclopedico Grijalbo, 

1730 births
1789 deaths
18th-century Cuban historians